Robert Lamberton may refer to:

Robert Lamberton (judge) (1809–1885), founder of the first bank in Venago County and later associate judge of the Courts of Venango County, Pa.
Robert Eneas Lamberton (1886–1941), American Republican politician
Robert D. Lamberton, professor of classics at Washington University in St. Louis and translator of Thomas the Obscure